is a town located in Kaho District, Fukuoka Prefecture, Japan. As of April 30, 2017, the town has an estimated population of 13,750 and a density of 690 persons per km². The total area is 20.07 km².

Keisen was home to Fukuoka POW Camp in 1944 during World War II.

There are many Kofun in Keisen; Ōzuka Kofun, near Keisen Station, is designated as a site of special historic interest (one of only two of its kind in Japan), and has its own museum. Ozuka was built in the 6th century AD as a decorated mound tomb. It was rediscovered in 1934, and the artifacts found inside are now at Kyoto National Museum. It was closed to the public for preservation in 1967, but is now open twice a year. The museum has a full size reconstruction of the tomb with information in Japanese and English. Admittance is 310 yen for adults, as of 2009. Its archeological importance is perhaps comparable with that of Sutton Hoo.

In July 2010 a landslide after heavy rain destroyed a house.

References

External links
 Keisen official website 

Towns in Fukuoka Prefecture